Anzac Village is a census-designated place (CDP) in Cibola County, New Mexico, United States. The population was 54 at the 2010 census.

Geography
It is bordered on the north by Anzac Road in the valley of the Rio San Jose; the road connects with Historic U.S. Route 66 to the east and west.

Demographics

References

Census-designated places in Cibola County, New Mexico
Census-designated places in New Mexico
Acoma Pueblo